Hagafoss is a small village in Hol municipality in Buskerud, Norway.

Hagafoss is located in upper Hallingdal where the road branches off towards Aurland along Norwegian county road  50 (Fv50). The main tourist attraction in the village is Hol Bygdemuseum, an open-air museum founded in 1914.

Hol Church (Hol kyrkje) is located in Hagafoss. The church was constructed of wood during 1924 and has 400 seats. The architect was Ole Eriksen Stein (1867-1950).

References

External links
Hol Bygdemuseum
Hol kyrkje i Hagafoss

Villages in Buskerud